The Formosa whorltail iguana (Stenocercus formosus) is a species of lizard of the Tropiduridae family, found in Peru. It was first described by Johann Jakob von Tschudi in 1845.

References

Stenocercus
Reptiles described in 1845
Taxa named by Johann Jakob von Tschudi
Endemic fauna of Peru
Reptiles of Peru